The United Airlines Tournament of Champions is a defunct WTA Tour affiliated tennis tournament played from 1980 to 1986. It was held in Orlando, Florida in the United States from 1980 through 1985, where it was played on outdoor hard courts at the Greenelefe Golf & Tennis Resort from 1980 through 1983 and on clay courts at the Grand Cypress resort in 1984 and 1985. In 1986 the tournament moved to Marco Island, Florida where it was played on clay courts. Only players who had won a tournament with prize money of at least $20,000 during the previous year were eligible to enter the event.

Martina Navratilova was the most successful player at the tournament, winning the first six singles competitions and winning the doubles competition three times.

Results

Singles

Doubles

See also
 Barnett Bank Tennis Classic – women's tournament in Orlando (1974–1975)

References

 
Clay court tennis tournaments
WTA Tour
Defunct tennis tournaments in the United States
Recurring sporting events established in 1980
Recurring sporting events disestablished in 1986
Hard court tennis tournaments
1980 establishments in Florida
1986 disestablishments in Florida
Sports competitions in Orlando, Florida
Collier County, Florida